Mrigendra Raj Pandey is a Nepalese physician from Kathmandu. He is one of the most senior doctors of Nepal and probably the first cardiologist in the country. He was the personal physician to the King Mahendra. He was the first chief editor of the Journal of Nepal Medical Association from 1963 to 1964. He is also the founder of the Nepal Heart Foundation. He has established the Mrigendra Samjhana Memorial Trust.

References

Nepalese physicians